Man at the Top was a British kitchen sink drama television series that originally aired on ITV, lasting for 23 episodes between 1970 and 1972. The series depicted the character of Joe Lampton, the protagonist of John Braine's novels Room at the Top (1957) and Life at the Top (1962), and of the films based on those novels (Room at the Top (1959) and Life at the Top (1965)). In 1973, a spin-off film from the series, Man at the Top, was released.

Cast
 Kenneth Haigh – Joe Lampton
 Zena Walker – Susan Lampton
 Mark Dignam (series 1) / Paul Hardwick (series 2) – Abe Brown
 Avice Landone – Margaret Brown
 Keith Skinner (series 1) / Brendan Price (series 2) – Harry Lampton
 Colin Welland – Charlie Armitage
 James Donnelly – Teddy Soames
 Kim McCarthy – Barbara Lampton
 Janet Key – Dr. Helen Reid
 Ann Lynn – Jonni Devon
 Katy Manning - Julia Dungarvon

External links

1970 British television series debuts
1972 British television series endings
1970s British drama television series
ITV television dramas
Films based on works by John Braine
Television shows produced by Thames Television
Television series by Fremantle (company)
English-language television shows
Television shows shot at Teddington Studios